The McIntosh County School District is a public school district in McIntosh County, Georgia, United States, based in Darien. It serves the communities of Crescent, Darien, Eulonia, and Townsend.

Schools
The McIntosh County School District has two elementary schools, one middle school, and one high school.
Todd Grant Elementary School
McIntosh County Middle School
McIntosh County Academy (High school)

Facilities
The district headquarters were previously at 200 Pine Street.

References

External links

School districts in Georgia (U.S. state)
Education in McIntosh County, Georgia